Panegyrtes clarkei is a species of beetle in the family Cerambycidae. It was described by Galileo and Martins in 2007. It is known from Bolivia.

References

Desmiphorini
Beetles described in 2007